André Lejeune (4 July 1935 – 9 September 2009) was a French politician and a member of both the National Assembly and then Senate of France.

In the National Assembly from 1981–1993, he represented Creuse's 1st constituency as a member of the Socialist Party until he was defeated by Bernard de Froment in the 1993 election.  From 1998 to 2009, Lejeune represented Creuse in the Senate.

Following his death from lung cancer, he was replaced in the Senate by his suppleant, Renée Nicoux.

References

1935 births
2009 deaths
French Senators of the Fifth Republic
Socialist Party (France) politicians
Senators of Creuse